Price County Airport  is a county owned public airport located one mile northwest of Phillips, in Price County, Wisconsin, United States. It is included in the Federal Aviation Administration (FAA) National Plan of Integrated Airport Systems for 2021–2025, in which it is categorized as a local general aviation facility.

Many U.S. airports use the same three-letter location identifier for the FAA and IATA, but this facility is assigned PBH by the FAA and has no designation from the IATA (which assigned PBH to Paro Airport in Paro, Bhutan).

Facilities and aircraft 
Price County Airport covers 518 acres (210 ha) at an elevation of 1,496 feet (456 m) above mean sea level. It has two asphalt runways: 1/19 is 5,220 by 75 feet (1,591 x 23 m) and 6/24 is 3,951 by 75 feet (1,204 x 23 m), all with approved GPS approaches.

For the twelve month period ending August 19, 2020 the airport had 18,100 aircraft operations, an average of 49 per day: 84% general aviation, 15% air taxi and 1% military. In February 2023, there were 14 aircraft based at this airport: all 14 single-engine.

See also 
 List of airports in Wisconsin

References

External links 
  at Wisconsin DOT Airport Directory
 

Airports in Wisconsin
Buildings and structures in Price County, Wisconsin
Transportation in Price County, Wisconsin